Nick Estes is an Indigenous organizer, journalist, and historian. He has cofounded The Red Nation and Red Media. In 2019 he was awarded the Lannan Literary Award Fellowship for nonfiction, and in 2020 he was honored as the Marguerite Casey Foundation's freedom scholar. He was previously an assistant professor at the University of New Mexico, but is a faculty member at the University of Minnesota as of 2022.

Bibliography

Books 

 2019: Our History is the Future: Standing Rock versus the Dakota Access Pipeline, and the Long Tradition of Indigenous Resistance, Verso
 2019: Standing with Standing Rock: Voices from the #NoDAPL Movement. University of Minnesota Press
 2021: Red Nation Rising: From Bordertown Violence to Native Liberation. PM Press

References

External links 
 Estes profile at The Baffler
 Estes profile at High Country News
 Estes profile for The Intercept
 Estes profile at The Guardian
 Estes profile at The Nation

Brulé people
Native American journalists
Native American writers
American journalism academics
American Marxist journalists
American activist journalists
Year of birth missing (living people)
Living people